Commander, Naval Air Forces ( COMNAVAIRFOR, and CNAF; and dual-hatted as Commander, Naval Air Force, Pacific, and COMNAVAIRPAC) is the aviation Type Commander (TYCOM) for all United States Navy naval aviation units.  Type Commanders are in Administrative Control (ADCON), and in some cases Operational Control (OPCON) of certain types of assets (ships, submarines, aircraft, and Fleet Marines) assigned to the Pacific and Atlantic Fleets.  AIRFOR is responsible for the materiel readiness, administration, training, and inspection of units/squadrons under their command, and for providing operationally ready air squadrons and aircraft carriers to the fleet.

COMNAVAIRFOR is a three-star headquarters, based at NAS North Island in Coronado, California.  The current commander is VADM Kenneth R. Whitesell.  The staff is made up of approximately 515 officer, enlisted, civilian and contractor personnel. The position is colloquially known throughout the Navy as "the Air Boss", mimicking the nickname given to the officer who commands the air department on an aircraft carrier.

Mission
"Man, train, and equip deployable, combat-ready naval Aviation forces that win in combat."

Naval Aviation Enterprise (NAE)
Commander, Naval Air Forces (CNAF), also known as the "Air Boss," is the senior Navy leader of the Naval Aviation Enterprise (NAE) and is responsible for all Naval Aviation programs, personnel and assets. CNAF is a dual-hatted position where the incumbent concurrently functions as Commander, Naval Air Force, U.S. Pacific Fleet (COMNAVAIRPAC).  CNAF is supported by Commander, Naval Air Force, U.S. Atlantic Fleet (COMNAVAIRLANT); Commander, Naval Air Force Reserve (COMNAVAIRES); the Chief of Naval Air Training (CNATRA); and the Commander, Naval Aviation Warfighting Development Center (NAWDC).

The NAE encompasses all of Naval Aviation and has three, three-star leaders. In addition to Air Boss, these leaders are the U.S. Marine Corps Deputy Commandant for Aviation and the commander of Naval Air Systems Command (COMNAVAIRSYSCOM).  Within the NAE there are approximately 3,800 sea-based and shore-based aircraft that perform strike/fighter, electronic attack, airborne early warning, maritime patrol and reconnaissance, anti-surface warfare, anti-submarine/sub-surface warfare, strategic communications relay, search and rescue (SAR), helicopter mine countermeasures, training, and logistical support missions.  These assets include 11 aircraft carriers and approximately 100,000 active and reserve military personnel, as well as Department of the Navy civilians and contractors.

History
In October 1919, Air Detachment, Pacific Fleet came into existence, making naval aviation formally part of the U.S. Pacific Fleet.  The original organization was divided into Landplane, Shipplane and Seaplane divisions. Within a brief period, the three divisions evolved into Fighting, Spotting and Seaplane Patrol Squadrons, respectively. The purpose of air detachments was: "attack on enemy aircraft, spotting gunfire for surface craft torpedo attack by torpedo planes, demolition, toxic gas and incendiary bomb attack, smoke and gas screen laying, mine and countermining; flare dropping; scouting reconnaissance, patrol and convoy duty; photography, mapping, detection of enemy coastal defenses and mail passenger service."

In June 1922 as part of a reorganization combining the Atlantic and Pacific Fleets into the U.S. Fleet, the detachment was renamed Aircraft Squadrons, Battle Fleet.  In 1933, another reorganization established two principal commands: Commander Aircraft Battle Force and Commander Tender-based Aircraft.

Commander, Air Pacific was established during World War II as the requirements of supporting air combat units widely deployed in the Pacific Ocean area increased.

Finding much inefficiency in the various administrative commands within naval aviation, Admiral Chester W. Nimitz, Commander in Chief, United States Pacific Fleet directed a consolidation of various administrative functions for a more efficient command structure.  This new command became Air Pacific Fleet, "to function as a Type Commander for fleet aircraft, to prepare general policy and doctrine for the operation of aviation units, to recommend the types, characteristics and numbers of aircraft required, and to carry out the strategic distribution of all air units in the Pacific area."

On July 29, 1942, Admiral Ernest King approved the recommendation and thus established Commander U.S. Naval Air Forces, Pacific Fleet (COMNAVAIRPAC), effective September 1, 1942. Vice Admiral John Henry Towers became its commander soon afterwards.

In May 1949, the headquarters was moved from Pearl Harbor, Hawaii to Naval Air Station, North Island, California.

In October 2001, the Chief of Naval Operations redesignated Commander, Naval Air Force U.S. Atlantic Fleet (AIRPAC's East Coast counterpart) from a three star command into a two star command and placed it under AIRPAC's command in a "Lead-Follow" arrangement.  Under this arrangement COMNAVAIRPAC became TYCOM for Air, and assumed the additional title of Commander, Naval Air Forces (COMNAVAIRFOR).  The Chief of Naval Air Training (CNATRA) and the Commander, Naval Air Force Reserve (COMNAVAIRES) were also subsequently placed under the aegis of COMNAVAIRFOR.

Past commanders

 Vice Admiral John B. Nathman (August 2000 – August 2, 2002)
 Vice Admiral Michael D. Malone (August 2, 2002 – August 17, 2004)
 Vice Admiral James M. "Jim" Zortman (August 17, 2004 – June 22, 2007)
 Vice Admiral Thomas J. "Tom" Kilcline Jr. (June 22, 2007 – July 1, 2010)
 Vice Admiral Allen G. "Al" Myers IV (July 1, 2010 – October 4, 2012)
 Vice Admiral David H. Buss (October 4, 2012 – January 22, 2015) 
 Vice Admiral Troy M. "Mike" Shoemaker (January 22, 2015 – January 11, 2018)
 Vice Admiral DeWolfe Miller III (January 11, 2018 – October 2, 2020) 
 Vice Admiral Kenneth R. Whitesell (October 2, 2020 – Present)

Subordinate commands

Commander, Fleet Air, Western Pacific (COMFAIRWESTPAC)

Commander, Patrol And Reconnaissance Group, Pacific

Commander, Patrol and Reconnaissance Wing TEN
VQ-1 World Watchers
VP-1 Screaming Eagles
VP-4 Skinny Dragons
VP-9 Golden Eagles
VP-40 Fighting Marlins
VP-46 Gray Knights
VP-47 Golden Swordsmen















Carrier Air Wing Two

Carrier Air Wing Five

Carrier Air Wing Nine

Carrier Air Wing Eleven

Carrier Air Wing Fourteen

Carrier Air Wing Seventeen

Commander, Airborne Command, Control, Logistics Wing (COMACCLOGWING)

Commander, Strike Fighter Wing Pacific (COMSTRKFIGHTWINGPAC)

Commander, Joint Strike Fighter Wing (COMJSFWING)
VFA-97 Warhawks
VFA-125 Rough Raiders (FRS)
VFA-147 Argonauts

Commander, Electronic Attack Wing, Pacific (COMVAQWINGPAC)
VAQ-129 Vikings (FRS)
VAQ-130 Zappers
VAQ-131 Lancers
VAQ-132 Scorpions (Expeditionary)
VAQ-133 Wizards 
VAQ-134 Garudas (Expeditionary)
VAQ-135 Black Ravens (Expeditionary)
VAQ-136 Gauntlets
VAQ-137 Rooks
VAQ-138 Yellowjackets (Expeditionary)
VAQ-139 Cougars
VAQ-140 Patriots
VAQ-141 Shadowhawks (MCAS Iwakuni, Japan)
VAQ-142 Gray Wolves 
VAQ-144 Main Battery
Electronic Attack Weapons School (EAWS)

Commander, Helicopter Maritime Strike Wing Pacific (COMHSMWINGPAC)
HSM-35 Magicians (Expeditionary)
HSM-37 Easyriders (Expeditionary)
HSM-41 Seahawks (FRS)
HSM-49 Scorpions (Expeditionary)
HSM-51 Warlords (Expeditionary) (NAF Atsugi, Japan) 
HSM-71 Raptors
HSM-73 Battle Cats
HSM-75 Wolfpack
HSM-77 Saberhawks (NAF Atsugi, Japan)
HSM-78 Blue Hawks
Helicopter Maritime Strike Weapons School Pacific (HSMWSP)

Commander, Helicopter Sea Combat Wing Pacific (COMHSCWINGPAC)
HSC-3 Merlins (FRS)
HSC-4 Black Knights
HSC-6 Indians
HSC-8 Eightballers
HSC-12 Golden Falcon (NAF Atsugi, Japan)
HSC-14 Chargers
HSC-21 Blackjacks (Expeditionary)
HSC-23 Wildcards (Expeditionary)
HSC-25 Island Knights (Expeditionary) (Anderson AFB, Guam)
Helicopter Sea Combat Weapons School Pacific (HSCWSP)

Commander, Fleet Logistics Multi-Mission Wing (VRMWING)
VRM-30 Titans
VRM-40 Mighty Bisons
VRM-50 Sunhawks (FRS)

Commander, Strategic Communications Wing ONE (COMSTRATCOMWING ONE)(Tinker Air Force Base, Oklahoma)
VQ-3 Ironman
VQ-4 Shadows
VQ-7 (FRS)

Commander, Naval Air Training Command (CNATRA)

Naval Flight Demonstration Squadron (NFDS) "Blue Angeles"

Commander, Training Air Wing One (TRAWING ONE)
VT-7 Eagles
VT-9 Tigers

Commander, Training Air Wing Two (TRAWING TWO)
VT-21 Read Hawks
VT-22 Golden Eagles

Commander, Training Air Wing Four (TRAWING FOUR)
VT-27 Boomers
VT-28 Rangers
VT-31 Wise Owls
VT-35 Stingrays

Commander, Training Air Wing Five (TRAWING FIVE)
VT-2 Doerbirds
VT-3 Red Knights
VT-6 Shooters
HT-8 Eightballers
HT-18 Vigilant Eagles
HT-28 Hellions

Commander, Training Air Wing Six (TRAWING SIX)
VT-4 Warbucks
VT-10 Wildcats
VT-86 Sabrehawks

See also
Naval aviation
Modern US Navy carrier air operations
List of United States Navy aircraft designations (pre-1962)
List of US Naval aircraft
United States Naval Aviator
Naval flight officer
List of United States Navy aircraft wings
Carrier air wing
List of United States Navy aircraft squadrons
Commander, Naval Air Force U.S. Atlantic Fleet

References

External links
 

Type commands of the United States Navy
Commander Naval Air
United States naval aviation